In Aztec mythology, the  are the four gods of maize. They are sons of the goddess  and the god .

Their names are:

  (meaning white corn)
  (meaning red corn)
  (meaning yellow corn)
  (meaning black corn)

Notes 

Aztec gods
Quartets
Agricultural gods